Ralph Calcagni (February 6, 1922 – August 29, 1948) was an American football tackle. He played for the Boston Yanks in 1946 and for the Pittsburgh Steelers in 1947.

References

1922 births
1948 deaths
American football tackles
Cornell Big Red football players
Penn Quakers football players
Boston Yanks players
Pittsburgh Steelers players
Players of American football from Pennsylvania
People from Westmoreland County, Pennsylvania
United States Marine Corps personnel of World War II
United States Marine Corps officers
Military personnel from Pennsylvania